The Zimbabwe national cricket team toured Pakistan from November to December 1998 and played a three-match Test series against the Pakistan national cricket team. Zimbabwe won the opening Test by 7 wickets, their first overseas victory, and went on to win the series 1–0. Zimbabwe were captained by Alistair Campbell and Pakistan by Aamer Sohail. In addition, the teams played a three-match Limited Overs International (LOI) series which Pakistan won 2–1.

ODI series

1st ODI

2nd ODI

3rd ODI

Test series summary

1st Test

2nd Test

3rd Test

References

External links

1998 in Pakistani cricket
1998 in Zimbabwean cricket
International cricket competitions from 1997–98 to 2000
Pakistani cricket seasons from 1970–71 to 1999–2000
1998